Justin King (born June 13, 1979) is an American musician and artist from Eugene, Oregon. Currently, King is running a recording studio in Brooklyn, New York called Vinegar Hill Sound as well as doing part-time war photojournalism in places like Iraq and Afghanistan.

Background and current activities 
King attended Marist High School before attending South Eugene High School. He dropped out of high school as a sophomore and entered the San Francisco Art Institute to study painting. He began playing drums and guitar around age 14 and wrote and performed songs with his current bassist, Drew Dresman. King began to focus on acoustic guitar at age 19, and in 1999 he released his self-titled album, followed by Opening in 2000. In 2001, King recorded "Le Bleu".

King returned to the US and began construction on his own studio "Blackberry Hill". The studio took about two years to complete during which time King toured the country as a solo guitarist opening for James Taylor, BB King, Diana Krall, North Mississippi All-Stars, Al Green and others. Just after building Blackberry Hill King recorded another instrumental record, "I-XII". Shortly after that King started a band with James West (later replaced by Nadir Jeevanjee), Troy Sicotte (later replaced by Drew Dresman), and Ehren Ebbage (later replaced by Chris Plank). The band toured the country for about one year before being signed to a major label record deal with Epic Records in 2006.

The band recorded the self-titled "Justin King and the Apologies" record at King's Blackberry Hill studio as well as studios in Los Angeles, New York, and San Francisco. The band broke up around the end of 2007.

Le Bleu and various side projects 
In 2001, King released Le Bleu. 

He assembled a new band with longtime friends Ehren Ebbage (lead guitar) and Drew Desman (bass).  In 2005, drummer James West and was replaced by Nadir Jeevanjee.

On March 20, 2007, King and his band, after a long struggle, ended their contract with Sony BMG/Epic Records. The band released a five-song EP, Fall/Rise, in spring 2007 before resuming touring, which included several performances in South Korea.  The band's debut album, Justin King and The Apologies, was released on September 28, 2007.

His Myspace page announced the title of the new album as Humilitas Occidit Superbiam, and it was subsequently released digitally in November 2009.

Discography

Solo albums
Justin King (1999) (out of print)
Opening (2000) (out of print)
Le Bleu (2001)
Humilitas Occidit Superbiam (2009)

Justin King and The Apologies
Justin King and The Apologies (2007)
Pilot (2003) (EP)
Bright and Dirty Lights (2005) (EP)
Bright and Dirty Lights Taster Disc (2005)
C-Sides (2006) (EP)
Fall/Rise (2007) (EP)

Justin King and The Raging Family
Re Bleu: The Raging Family Le Bleu Remix (2008)

King West Manring Vamos
I-XII (2008)

References

External links
 

1979 births
Living people
Musicians from Eugene, Oregon
American acoustic guitarists
American male guitarists
American rock guitarists
Fingerstyle guitarists
Pacific Northwest College of Art alumni
Guitarists from Oregon
21st-century American guitarists
21st-century American male musicians
San Francisco Art Institute alumni